Rajiv Gandhi Bhawan is the corporate headquarters of Airports Authority of India (AAI). AAI which functions under the Ministry of Civil Aviation and manages most of the airports in India. The Indian Ministry of Civil Aviation is co-located in the same building.

Mehro Consultants was involved in the design of the building.

It has been used as a metonym for the Ministry of Civil Aviation.

It is named after Rajiv Gandhi.

Design of the building
The building has a unique plan. This can be seen in the picture opposite, showing the aerial view as seen from the satellite. This building is on the Aurobindo Marg, with Safdarjung's Tomb adjacent on the right-hand side and the Aero Club of India on the left, and near Safdarjung Airport.

References

External links

Airports Authority of India, (AAI) website

Government buildings in Delhi
Headquarters in India
Aviation in India
Ministry of Civil Aviation (India)